Tadamori is a Japanese surname and masculine given name.

Kanji
Kanji used to write the name Tadamori include:
: "forest with many fields"
: "manages the forest"
: "loyal and flourishing"
: "three protections", "third protection". Also read Mimori, Mitsumori, or Sanmori.

Given name
People with this given name include:
, samurai of the Taira Clan
, Japanese politician with the Liberal Democratic Party

See also
4374 Tadamori, a minor planet

References

Japanese-language surnames
Japanese masculine given names